Henry Johannessen (12 December 1923 – 1 March 2005) was a Norwegian football player. He was born in Fredrikstad, and played for the sports club Fredrikstad FK. He played for the Norwegian national team at the 1952 Summer Olympics in Helsinki. He scored seven goals in 14 matches for Norway between 1946 and 1955.

References

External links

1923 births
2005 deaths
Sportspeople from Fredrikstad
Norwegian footballers
Norway international footballers
Fredrikstad FK players
Footballers at the 1952 Summer Olympics
Olympic footballers of Norway
Association footballers not categorized by position